Park Su-il is a North Korean politician and military officer of the Korean People's Army. He is a member of the Central Committee of the Workers' Party of Korea and a delegate to the Supreme People's Assembly, North Korea's unicameral parliament. He has served as Chief of the General Staff Department of the Korean People's Army since 28 December 2022.

Biography
In 2014, he was elected to the 13 convocation of the Supreme People's Assembly, representing the 137th electoral district (Phyongchonkang). He was also elected to the 14th convocation of the Supreme People's Assembly, representing the 183rd electoral district (Roktusan). Following the 7th Congress of the Workers' Party of Korea, he was elected to the 7th Central Committee of the Party. He served as the commander of a military unit on the border with the People's Republic of China. On September 2018 he was appointed to the head of the General Staff Operations Bureau.

Park was appointed Chief of the General Staff on 28 December 2022.

References

North Korean generals
Members of the Supreme People's Assembly
Members of the 8th Central Committee of the Workers' Party of Korea